Super Doubles Tennis is an arcade game released by Data East in 1983.

Gameplay
The game puts four players on a tennis match - two humans and two computer-controlled players. If one player decides to play without company, the computer takes the role of the player's partner.

Reception 
In Japan, Game Machine listed Super Doubles Tennis on their November 1, 1983 issue as being the fourth most-successful new table arcade unit of the month.

References

External links

1983 video games
Arcade video games
Arcade-only video games
Data East video games
Tennis video games
Video games developed in Japan
Data East arcade games